Shear is a surname. Notable people with the surname include:

Barry Shear (1923–1979), American film director and producer
Byron D. Shear (1869–1929), American politician
Claudia Shear (born 1962), American actress and playwright
Cornelius Lott Shear (1865–1956), American mycologist and plant pathologist
David B. Shear (born 1954), American diplomat
Harold E. Shear (1918–1999), American Navy admiral
Joe Shear (1943–1998), American race car driver
Jules Shear (born 1952), American singer-songwriter
Linda Shear (born 1948), American musician
Marie Shear (1940–2017), American writer and activist
Matthew Shear (born 1984), American actor
Michael D. Shear, American journalist
Rhonda Shear (born 1954), American entertainer and entrepreneur
Tom Shear, American musician and music producer 
Wayne G. Shear Jr., American Navy admiral
William Shear (born 1942), American zoologist